Camilla Lees (born 27 March 1989 in Pukekohe, New Zealand) is a New Zealand netball player.

Lees made her debut in the ANZ Championship with the Central Pulse in 2009, after initially being considered for the Canterbury Tactix. She made the New Zealand U21 team in 2007, and won a silver medal with the team at the 2009 World Youth Netball Championships in the Cook Islands. Her performance in the Pulse midcourt also earned her a spot in the Silver Ferns that year, and the FastNet Ferns the following year. She was recalled to the Silver Ferns for the 2011 test series against England as cover for the injured Grace Rasmussen.

After the retirement of Temepara George and Liana Leota, she was selected into the Silver Ferns for the 2012 season, as the side's top WA. She played all three tests of the 2012 Constellation Cup, which the Ferns won. She had to miss the first three tests of the Quad Series due to her study commitments, where the Ferns slumped to a twenty-goal loss without her. She was back for the next test against Australia, which ended up a much improved performance and a six-goal win.

She has studied Medicine throughout her netball career, and graduated at the end of 2012.

Following the conclusion to the 2014 ANZ Championship Lees signed to play with the Northern Mystics for the following season.

In 2015 she announced that she will no longer participate in the netball tournaments due to her medical career and therefore retires.

References

External links
2011 Silver Ferns profile
2010 ANZ Championship profile

1989 births
Living people
ANZ Championship players
Central Pulse players
New Zealand international netball players
New Zealand netball players
People educated at St Cuthbert's College, Auckland
Sportspeople from the Auckland Region
University of Otago alumni
Northern Mystics players
New Zealand international Fast5 players